Emily Selinger (McGary; February 22, 1848 – July 16, 1927) was an American painter of still life and floral, author of travel writing and poetry, and an educator.

Early life and education
Emily Harris McGary was born in Wilmington, North Carolina, February 22, 1848.

Her parents were James and Elizabeth Otis Paine (Keller) McGary. She was a descendant on her father's side of Flora McDonald. Her father, a planter, amassed a fortune in the East India trade. He died just before the American Civil War, and his family were stripped of the large fortune left them through the mismanagement of a relative and by the war. The mother took her three young daughters to Providence, Rhode Island, to educate them. Selinger was a precocious child, showing aptitude for anything in the line of music, art and language. She finished the high school course in Providence, studied with private tutors, and ended with a course in the Cooper Institute School of Design in New York City. With art, she studied medicine, but decided not to attempt to practice in that field.

Career
At the age of nineteen, she taught in southern schools, acting as instructor in painting, drawing, elocution, botany, French and Latin for seven years in various institutions. While teaching in Louisville, Kentucky, she read a paper on "Art Education" before a gathering of five-hundred teachers, which resulted in the establishment of a normal art-school in that city, of which she was principal. Ill-health compelled her to go north, and she returned to Providence, where she opened a studio.

In Providence, on October 9, 1882,  she married Jean Paul Selinger (1850–1909), the artist. From 1882 to 1885, they traveled in Europe, studying in Italy, and while abroad Mrs. Selinger corresponded for the Boston Transcript.

She became a student of flower-painting, and earned the title "Emily Selinger, the Rose Painter." Returning to the United States, Mr. and Mrs. Selinger settled in Boston, Massachusetts. Her work was popular, and her rose pictures were found in notable collection in the U.S. She was also a successful author.

She was a member of the New England Woman's Press Association, as well as an honorary artist member of the Professional Woman's Club. She had summer studios in New Hampshire; from the mid 1880s, at Glen House, and from 1894, at Crawford House.

Selinger exhibited at the Academy of Design (New York), Boston Art Club, and the Pennsylvania Academy of Fine Arts.

Awards and honors
Selinger was awarded the silver medal twice at the Mechanics' Association exhibits, and first prizes at several state fairs.

Personal life
Selinger was Roman Catholic by religion. 

Emily McGary Selinger died in Providence, Rhode Island, July 16, 1927. Her papers, as well as those of her husband, are held at the Archives of American Art.

Selected paintings
 A trailing arbutus greeting
 A flower for happiness
 Oh! I found so many beautiful things
 Four-leaved clover
 Over the garden wall

Selected publications
 Over the garden wall
 Oh! I found so many beautiful things
 Chromatics, 1915
 "A prayer for peace sent out to the world by the New England Women's Press Association", 1915

Songs
 "Two roses" (music by Hallett Gilberté; arranged by Louis Victor Saar; words by Emily Selinger)

Notes

References

Attribution

External links
 
  

1848 births
1927 deaths
19th-century American artists
20th-century American artists
20th-century American women artists
20th-century American writers
20th-century American women writers
Artists from North Carolina
Cooper Union alumni
People from Wilmington, North Carolina
Wikipedia articles incorporating text from A Woman of the Century